Chareh or Chereh or Chorreh or Chorrah or Choreh may refer to various places in Iran:
 Chorreh, Gilan (چره - Chorreh''')
 Chareh, Khuzestan (چاره - Chāreh)
 Chareh, Amol (چاره - Chāreh), Mazandaran Province
 Chareh, Babol (چاره - Chāreh), Mazandaran Province
 Chareh, West Azerbaijan (چره - Chareh'')

See also
 Cham Chareh (disambiguation)